"Been There Done That" is a song by Swedish production duo NOTD, featuring vocals of Swedish singer-songwriter Tove Styrke. The song was released by ToWonder and Universal Music Group on 24 August 2018, through streaming and digital download formats. "Been There Done That" was produced by the duo, and written by them alongside Swedish duo Jack & Coke and Kennedi Lykken.

Formats and track listings

Digital download
"Been There Done That" – 3:17

Digital download – Remixes EP
"Been There Done That"  – 2:54
"Been There Done That"  – 2:34
"Been There Done That"  – 2:48
"Been There Done That"  – 2:39
"Been There Done That"  – 3:10
"Been There Done That"  – 3:07

Charts

References

External links
 
 

2018 songs
2018 singles
NOTD songs
Tove Styrke songs
Universal Music Group singles
Songs written by Svante Halldin
Songs written by Jakob Hazell
Songs written by Kennedi Lykken